Mian Daj Mahalleh (also Romanized as Mīān Daj Maḩalleh) is a village in Goli Jan Rural District, in the Central District of Tonekabon County, Mazandaran Province, Iran. At the 2006 census, its population was 253, in 77 families.

References 

Populated places in Tonekabon County